The Black Moses is a 2013 documentary film directed by Travolta Cooper. The film had its world premiere on 8 December 2013 at the Bahamas International Film Festival, where it served as the festival's closing film. It went on to show at several other film festivals and received a distribution deal at the 2014 Cannes Film Festival. The Black Moses received a theatrical release in the United States and the Bahamas on 10 October 2014.

The film stars Dennis Haysbert and documents the life and times of Lynden Pindling, the first black Prime Minister of The Bahamas.

Premise
The film documents the life and times of Lynden Pindling and explores the idea of Pindling as a black national liberator and the rumors that he was involved in the drug trade. The Black Moses utilizes the ancient Moses legend and mythology as a model to tell the story and also features commentary from people such as Jesse Jackson, Andrew Young, Thabo Mbeki, and Pras Michel.

Production
Planning for The Black Moses began in 2010 when Cooper received a grant from the Cable Cares Foundation. Actor Dennis Haysbert was brought on to the project to perform as Black Moses,  a character that narrates the film and explores the mythology of Black Moses. Filming for The Black Moses took place over a period of several years, with principal photography commencing in 2011. While the bulk of production took place in Nassau, Bahamas, Coopre traveled to several locations including London, South Africa, and the United States in order to film commentators.

Reception
The Nassau Guardian reviewed The Black Moses, writing that "At times it felt like the movie was an apologist's thesis on an infalliable leader - then 10 seconds later it painted a picture of a flawed man who was aware of his faults." However they went on to say that "It is the most fitting narrative for one of the most glorified and vilified figures in Bahamian history. Whether you agree with its message or not, it goes further than any other documentary/poem/metaphor in dealing with this subject."

References

External links

2013 films
English-language Bahamian films
Documentary films about politicians
Politics of the Bahamas
2013 documentary films
2010s English-language films